Speranza subcessaria, the barred speranza, is a species of geometrid moth in the family Geometridae. It is found in North America.

The MONA or Hodges number for Speranza subcessaria is 6303.

References

Further reading

 

Macariini
Articles created by Qbugbot
Moths described in 1861